The Drayton Valley Thunder is a junior ice hockey team in the Alberta Junior Hockey League (AJHL).  The Thunder are members of the Canadian Junior Hockey League and are eligible to compete for the Doyle Cup and National Junior A Championship. They play in Drayton Valley, Alberta, Canada, at the Drayton Valley Omni-Plex.

History
In 1998, The Drayton Valley Thunder were awarded as an expansion franchise in the Alberta Junior Hockey League (AJHL) and began play in the South Division for the 1998–99 season. One year after finishing sixth in the South, ahead of only their fellow expansion team Crowsnest Pass Timberwolves, the Thunder improved in their second season and won the division. The addition of other expansion teams shifted the Thunder into the North Division in 2000–01, where they won another division title.

In 2002, the Thunder captured the Rogers Wireless Cup as AJHL champions.  The Thunder lost to the Chilliwack Chiefs of the British Columbia Hockey League (BCHL) in the Doyle Cup Pacific Junior A Championship.

Season-by-season record
Note: GP = Games played, W = Wins, L = Losses, T/OTL = Ties/Overtime losses, SOL = Shootout losses, Pts = Points, GF = Goals for, GA = Goals against

NHL alumni

Matt Berlin
Clarke MacArthur
Kael Mouillierat
Darren Reid
Ben Scrivens
Nick Tarnasky

See also
 List of ice hockey teams in Alberta

References

External links
Drayton Valley Thunder website
Alberta Junior Hockey League website

Alberta Junior Hockey League teams
Ice hockey teams in Alberta
Ice hockey clubs established in 1998
1998 establishments in Alberta